Wigor Alan do Nascimento (born 7 January 1995), simply known as Wigor, is a Brazilian footballer who plays as a defensive midfielder.

Club career
Born in Colorado, Paraná, Wigor started his career with Ranchariense, and graduated with Capivariano. After making his senior debuts in 2014 in Campeonato Paulista Série A2, he went on a trial at Anderlecht on 20 June of that year, and signed a short-term deal shortly after.

Assigned the  40 shirt, Wigor made no appearances for the side and was released in January 2015. He subsequently returned to Capivariano, appearing with the side in Campeonato Paulista.

On 30 April 2015 Wigor was loaned to Série B side Bragantino, until the end of the year. He made his debut for the club on 16 May, coming on as a second-half substitute in a 1–0 home win against Paysandu.

On 30 January 2017, Wigor joined Israeli Premier League side F.C. Ashdod until the end of the season. He returned after making no league appearances, and subsequently joined Santos' B-team.

Career statistics

References

External links
Bragantino official profile 

1995 births
Living people
Sportspeople from Paraná (state)
Brazilian footballers
Association football midfielders
Campeonato Brasileiro Série B players
Campeonato Brasileiro Série D players
Clube Atlético Votuporanguense players
Capivariano Futebol Clube players
Clube Atlético Bragantino players
Clube de Regatas Brasil players
Santos FC players
R.S.C. Anderlecht players
F.C. Ashdod players
Brazilian expatriate footballers
Brazilian expatriate sportspeople in Belgium
Brazilian expatriate sportspeople in Israel
Expatriate footballers in Belgium
Expatriate footballers in Israel